Sir Thomas Exmewe, born  in Ruthin, Denbighshire, was a member of the Goldsmiths Company. He was elected Sheriff of London in 1508 and Lord Mayor of London on 5 December 1517. He became the first Lord Mayor of London whose portrait is known to have been painted. The posthumous portrait, dated c. 1550, is now in the collection of the Guildhall Art Gallery and has been attributed to John Bettes the Elder.

Exmewe died in 1529. Thomas Exmewe was married to Elizabeth, formerly the wife of John West.

See also
List of lord mayors of London
List of sheriffs of London

References
Common Plea Rolls CP 40 / 1023 year 1519

1450s births
1529 deaths

Year of birth uncertain
People from Ruthin
Sheriffs of the City of London
Place of death unknown
Date of birth unknown
15th-century English people
16th-century lord mayors of London
English knights